Pierralit Tovonay (born 15 October 1991) is a retired Malagasy football defender.

References

1991 births
Living people
Malagasy footballers
Madagascar international footballers
Ajesaia players
CNaPS Sport players
Association football defenders
People from Menabe